Chinese Language and Culture may refer to:

Chinese Language and Culture (HKALE), a subject in Hong Kong Advanced Level Examination, a core subject for all F.6 and 7 students in Hong Kong
Advanced Placement Chinese Language and Culture, an Advanced Placement system subject with a totally different syllabus from the above one

See also
 Chinese language
 Chinese culture